Gatlin Glacier is a tributary glacier  long, flowing northwest between the Cumulus Hills and Red Raider Rampart to enter the south side of McGregor Glacier, Antarctica. It was named by the Advisory Committee on Antarctic Names for Harold C. Gatlin, a United States Antarctic Research Program meteorologist at South Pole Station in the winter of 1964.

References

Glaciers of Dufek Coast